Moanin' in the Moonlight is a compilation album and the first album by American blues artist Howlin' Wolf, released by Chess Records in 1959. It contains songs previously issued as singles, including one of his best-known, "Smokestack Lightning". Rolling Stone ranked it number 477 on its 2020 list of "the 500 Greatest Albums of All Time".

Recording and production 
The two earliest songs on Moanin' in the Moonlight were "Moanin' at Midnight" and "How Many More Years". These two songs and 'All Night Boogie', were recorded in Memphis, the first two at Sam Phillips' Memphis Recording Service in Memphis, Tennessee in July 1951, and, 'All Night Boogie', the last track on side one, in Memphis in 1953. These songs were sold to the Chess brothers, Leonard and Phil, who released them on two singles (Chess 1479 and Chess 1557), the first two titles being released on August 15, 1951. The rest of the songs on the album were recorded in Chicago, Illinois and were produced by either the Chess brothers and/or Willie Dixon.

Artwork, packaging, and promotion 
The original version of Moanin' in the Moonlight featured cover artwork by Don S. Bronstein and sleeve notes by Billboard editor Paul Ackerman. The label pressings from the original series have different colors on it because several pressing plants were used.

The album was featured on an advertisement in Billboard magazine on August 10, 1959, which misprinted the album's title as Howlin' at Midnite.

Accolades 
In 1987, Moanin' in the Moonlight was given a W.C. Handy Award in the "Vintage/Reissue Album (US)" category. Rolling Stone magazine ranked the album number 477 on its 2020 list of the 500 Greatest Albums of All Time. Robert Palmer has cited "How Many More Years" (recorded May 1951) as the first record to feature a distorted power chord, played by Willie Johnson on the electric guitar.

Track listing 

All songs written by Chester Burnett, except when noted. (Although the original 1959 LP, and the UK Chess 1965 issue credited all compositions to 'C. Burnett' [Howlin' Wolf].)

Side one
 "Moanin' at Midnight" – 2:58
 "How Many More Years" – 2:42
 "Smokestack Lightnin'" – 3:07
 "Baby How Long" – 2:56
 "No Place to Go" – 2:59
 "All Night Boogie" – 2:12

Side two
 "Evil" – 2:55 (Willie Dixon)
 "I'm Leavin' You" – 3:01
 "Moanin' for My Baby" – 2:47
 "I Asked for Water (She Gave Me Gasoline)" – 2:53
 "Forty-Four" – 2:51 (Roosevelt Sykes, credited to Burnett)
 "Somebody in My Home" – 2:27

Personnel 
The following people contributed to Moanin' in the Moonlight:
 Howlin' Wolfvocals, harmonica
 Willie Johnsonguitar
 Willie Steeledrums
 Ike Turnerpiano on "Moanin' at Midnight" and "How Many More Years"
 Hubert Sumlin – guitar
 Hosea Lee Kennard – piano
 Willie Dixon – double bass, producer
 Earl Phillips – drums
 Jody Williams – guitar
 Otis Spann – piano
 Lee Cooper – guitar on "No Place to Go"
 Fred Below – drums on "All Night Boogie"
 S. P. Leary – drums on "I'm leaving You"
 Adolph "Billy" Dockins – tenor saxophone on "Moanin' for My Baby"
 Otis "Smokey" Smothers – guitar on "I Asked for Water (She Gave Me Gasoline)"
 Sam Phillips – producer on "Moanin' at Midnight" and "How Many More Years"
 Leonard Chess – producer
 Phil Chess – producer

References 

1959 compilation albums
Chess Records compilation albums
Howlin' Wolf albums
Albums produced by Leonard Chess
Albums produced by Phil Chess
Albums produced by Willie Dixon
Albums produced by Sam Phillips
Albums recorded at Sun Studio